= Prindea =

Town in ancient Bithynia

Coordinates: 40°45′11″N 30°14′53″E

Prindea was a town of ancient Bithynia on the road east of Nicomedia. Its name does not occur in ancient authors but is inferred from epigraphic and other evidence.

Its site is tentatively located near Hamidiye in Asiatic Turkey.
